Arbeláez is a town and municipality in the Cundinamarca Department, Colombia. It borders Fusagasugá, Pasca and other municipalities of the Sumapaz Province.
Arbeláez is recognized as a quiet and friendly city of Colombia. It is known for its touristic interest due to mountain landscape, recreation centers, walking trails, ecotourism and sites presenting multiple opportunities for visitors.

External links 

  
 :es:Arbeláez

Municipalities of Cundinamarca Department